The Algerian Scale is a scale frequently used in Algerian, Berber, and North African music. The frequent use of 1.5 steps (a minor 3rd) in the scale contributes to a sound commonly associated with Moorish music.

It is also defined as an eleven note scale with two augmented seconds. Jacques Ibert first used this definition in Escales (1924).

In India's Carnatic music, this corresponds to Simhendramadhyamam.

Scale formula 
In step notation:
 W, H, WH, H, H, WH, H
 W = Whole step
 H = Half step
 WH = Whole-and-a-half step
or in decimals:
 1 step + 0.5 step + 1.5 step + 0.5 step + 0.5 step + 1.5 step + 0.5 step.

This formula gives the first octave only. In the second octave, the third step is 1 rather than 1.5, followed by a step of 1 rather than 0.5. This may be seen in images to the right. In the one on the bottom (with the three-octave spanning scale, Fischer 1996), the lower octave shows an F while the upper octave shows an F natural.

This can also be notated as degrees in relation to the root note:
 First octave: 1 2 3 4 5 6 7 8 
 Second octave: 1 2 3 4 5 6 7 8

It can also be thought of as Harmonic Minor with a raised 4 in the first octave.

Sources

External links 
 

Modes (music)
Hemitonic scales
Tritonic scales
Musical scales with augmented seconds